Dolná Trnávka  is a village and municipality in Žiar nad Hronom District in the Banská Bystrica Region of central Slovakia.

History
In historical records, the village was first mentioned in 1338 (Thornoka Inferior). It belonged to Šašov and after to Banská Štiavnica’s Mine Chamber.

Municipality
Since 2015 Dolná Trnávka is headed by Katarína Lajčiaková, who ran for mayor as an independent candidate. After 2018 elections, council consists of 5 councillors - two of them ran as independent candidates, two ran for ĽSNS and one ran for KDH.

In 2021, the municipality separates 75.7% of its municipal waste for recycling.

Genealogical resources

The records for genealogical research are available at the state archive "Statny Archiv in Banska Bystrica, Slovakia"

 Roman Catholic church records (births/marriages/deaths): 1671-1896 (parish B)

See also
 List of municipalities and towns in Slovakia

References

External links
https://web.archive.org/web/20080111223415/http://www.statistics.sk/mosmis/eng/run.html.  
http://www.e-obce.sk/obec/dolnatrnavka/dolna-trnavka.html
Surnames of living people in Dolna Trnavka

Villages and municipalities in Žiar nad Hronom District